JALC may refer to:

 Journal of Automata, Languages and Combinatorics
 Jazz at Lincoln Center